Matthew Robinson Boulton (8 August 1770 – 16 May 1842) was an English manufacturer, a pioneer of management, the son of Matthew Boulton and the father of Matthew Piers Watt Boulton, who first patented the aileron.  He was responsible with James Watt Jr. for the management of the Soho Foundry.

Matthew Robinson Boulton was mainly involved in the initial planning of the foundry, with James Watt Jr. being more concerned with daily management and organisation.

 Bibliography

References 

1770 births
1842 deaths
British inventors
British industrial engineers
People of the Industrial Revolution